Greg Fargo (born May 21, 1983) is a Canadian ice hockey coach. He is the current head coach for Colgate. He previously served as the head coach for Elmira College's women's ice hockey team.

Playing career
Fargo played college ice hockey at Elmira College where he posted a 45–29–9 record in 88 games for the Soaring Eagles. During his senior season, he recorded the lowest goals against average (2.04) and highest save percentage (.926) in program history. The Soaring Eagles won the ECAC West tournament and Fargo was named the tournament Most Outstanding Player. They advanced to the Final Four of the 2006 NCAA Division III men's ice hockey tournament. He also became the school's leader in career saves (2,565) and minutes played (5,122:53).

Coaching career

Elmira College
On June 6, 2008, Fargo was named head coach for his alma-mater, the Elmira College women's hockey team. He served as the head coach for four years, where he led the Soaring Eagles to a 85–23–5 record. During his first season at Elmira during the 2008–09 season, he led the team to a NCAA Division III women's ice hockey best 25 wins, ECAC West tournament championship, and a runner-up finish at the NCAA Division III women's ice hockey tournament. Following an outstanding season he was named ECAC West Co-Coach of the Year. During the 2009–10 season, he led the team to a second consecutive tournament championship, and a third-place finish at the NCAA Division III women's ice hockey tournament.

Colgate University
On May 14, 2012, Fargo was named the head coach of Colgate Raiders women's ice hockey team. During the 2017–18 season, Fargo led the Raiders to a program best record of 34–6–1, their first ECAC Hockey regular season title, and the NCAA women's ice hockey tournament for the first time in program history. During the 2018 NCAA National Collegiate women's ice hockey tournament, Colgate lost the championship game to Clarkson 1–2 in overtime. Following an outstanding season, Fargo was named the AHCA Coach of the Year.

During the 2020–21 season, he led the Raiders to a 15–7–1 record, and their first ECAC Hockey tournament championship in program history. Following the season, Fargo was named the ECAC Hockey Coach of the Year. On December 13, 2021, Fargo signed a contract extension at Colgate through the 2028 season. During the 2021–22 season, he led the Raiders to a 30–8–1 record, and their second consecutive ECAC Hockey tournament championship. During the 2022–23 season, he led the Raiders to a 32–5–2 record, and their third consecutive ECAC Hockey tournament championship.

Team Canada
On June 23, 2015, Fargo was named an assistant coach for Canada at the 2016 IIHF World Women's U18 Championship, where they won a silver medal.

Head coaching record

References

External links

1983 births
Living people
Canadian ice hockey coaches
Canadian ice hockey players
Colgate Raiders women's ice hockey coaches
Ice hockey people from Ontario
Sportspeople from Kingston, Ontario